Ptilometra australis, the passion flower feather star, is a species of crinoid.

Description
The passion flower feather star is a robust crinoid  with a diameter of about  when fully extended. It has eighteen to twenty jointed arms which can be coiled up when the animal is not feeding. These are attached to a cup-shaped body or calyx. The arms are edged by feathery appendages known as pinnules. Each pinnule has rows of tube feet on either side of a central ambulacral groove lined with cilia. This groove is continuous with the central groove on the arm which leads to the mouth at the centre of the calyx. The aboral (lower) surface of the crinoid has a number of hooked appendages called cirri which grip onto the substrate, which may be a rock, a sponge, a coral or sea fan. The colour of this crinoid is usually some shade of red, though subjection to organic solvents yields  a complex mixture of pigments whose components can be separated using chromatography.

Distribution and habitat
Its range extends from Masthead Island in Queensland and the mouth of the Clarence River in New South Wales to Port Philip Bay in Victoria. It is found on rocks and rubble in sheltered bays, in estuaries and on reefs.

Biology
The passion flower feather star is a filter feeder. It catches plankton and suspended particles of detritus with the tube feet on the pinnules. These feet are covered with sticky mucus that traps the food particles and then roll it into balls before moving them into the ambulacral groove, where cilia  propel the stream of mucus towards the mouth.

References

Comatulida
Animals described in 1843
Fauna of the Pacific Ocean